The Peter Mokaba Stadium is a football and rugby union stadium in Polokwane (formerly Pietersburg), South Africa, that was used for the 2010 FIFA World Cup. It has a capacity of 45,500 but for the purposes of the 2010 FIFA World Cup the seating capacity was reduced to 41,733. It is named after Peter Mokaba, a former leader of the ANC Youth League. It is located 3 kilometers from the city center and is located just east of the older Peter Mokaba Stadium.

The stadium is one of five new stadiums that were built for the 2010 FIFA World Cup. Initial plans to upgrade the existing Old Peter Mokaba Stadium were abandoned in favour of the R1,245,000,000 (ZAR) new Peter Mokaba stadium.

The stadium was used intensely for training and matches. Therefore, the natural grass has been reinforced with artificial fibers, which anchors the field into a stable and a level grass surface of Desso GrassMaster.

2010 FIFA World Cup
The stadium hosted four Group matches during the tournament of the 2010 FIFA World Cup.

Soccer 
The first event at the stadium was the Peter Mokaba Cup, held on 23 January 2010. It was a 4 team, friendly tournament, which served as the stadium's opening event. In the first semi-final, SuperSport United beat Danish side Brøndby 2–1. In the second semi-final, Kaizer Chiefs advanced after beating Wits 4–3 on penalties, after a goalless draw. Kaizer Chiefs defeated Supersport United 4–2 in the final.

The first international game played at the stadium was the international friendly between South Africa and Guatemala on 31 May 2010, which South Africa won 5–0.

The stadium hosted its first competitive football match on 20 November 2010. Kaizer Chiefs opted to host their 2010–11 Telkom Knockout semi-final against Santos at the stadium. The match ended 1–0 to Kaizer Chiefs.

Rugby
The stadium hosted its first rugby union match on 30 January 2010. The match was a Super 14 warm up match, played for the Xerox Cup. It was contested by the Bulls and Lions.

References

External links

Photos of Stadiums in South Africa at cafe.daum.net/stade
ESPN Stadium Profile
Goal.com Profile
360 View

Soccer venues in South Africa
Polokwane
2010 FIFA World Cup stadiums
Sports venues in Limpopo
Polokwane City F.C.